Flesh and the Spur is a 1956 Western film directed by Edward L. Cahn.  The film stars John Agar as Lucius Random, Marla English as Wild Willow and Mike Connors (billed here as Touch Connors) as Stacy Tanner. The film was released by American International Pictures as a double feature with Naked Paradise. The plot is about a young cowboy who searches for the killer of his twin brother.

Plot
Tanner is a desperate prisoner who escapes from jail and promptly murders an innocent farmer named Matthew Random.  Stealing Random's horse and gun, the outlaw promptly makes his escape. Finding his twin brother murdered, Lucius Random (Agar) vows revenge and sets off to find the killer.

Although he does not know the identity of the killer, Random knows that he is part of the nefarious "Checker Gang" and can be identified by the gun he stole from Matthew, which is one of a unique set of two that the brothers Matthew and Lucius owned between them.

Cast
John Agar as Luke Random/Matthew Random
Marla English as Willow
Touch Connors as Stacey Doggett
Raymond Hatton as Windy
 Maria Monay as Lola
Joyce Meadows as Rena
Kenne Duncan as Cale Tanner
Frank Lackteen as Indian chief
 Mel Gaines as Blackie
Michael Harris as Deputy marshal
Eddie Kafafian as Bud
Kermit Maynard as Outlaw

Production
The film was originally titled Dead Man's Gun.

Mike Connors also acted as executive producer and raised the money with Charles Lyons from Armenian friends for the film's $117,000 budget.  He recalled being called in to a meeting with AIP's James H. Nicholson, Samuel Z. Arkoff and Alex Gordon.  They showed him a poster of leading lady Marla English tied to a stake with fire ants crawling on her. Connors remarked that there was no such scene in the script.  The AIP heads replied that the movie had been presold on the basis of Albert Kallis' artwork and that the anthill torture scene would be written in later. (This was a marketing ploy frequently used by AIP to promote films during pre-production, often before the screenplay had been written.) Alex Gordon recalled dropping ants on the bound and gagged Marla. However, the ants would promptly run away from her.  The ungagged Marla finally asked Gordon "Look, you've got six ants there, isn't that enough??"

Release
The film was released on a double bill with Naked Paradise. Although popular it was the last Western made by AIP who preferred to concentrate on genres more specifically targeted at the teenage audience.

Marla English retired soon after making the film.

Home media
On October 27, 2009, Alpha Video released Flesh and the Spur on Region 0 DVD.

Notes

External links

The Flesh and the Spur at TCMDB
 
Review of film at Variety

1956 films
1950s English-language films
Films directed by Edward L. Cahn
1956 Western (genre) films
American International Pictures films
Films with screenplays by Charles B. Griffith
Films scored by Ronald Stein
American Western (genre) films
1950s American films